This list comprises all players who have participated in at least one league match for DFW Tornados (formerly Addison Arrows, Arlington Arrows, Dallas Americans, Dallas Kickers, Dallas Toros, DFW Toros, Fort Worth Kickers, Garland Genesis, North Texas United, Texas Rattlers, Texas Spurs and Texas Toros) in the USL since the league began keeping detailed records in 2003. Players who were on the roster but never played a first team game are not listed; players who appeared for the team in other competitions (US Open Cup, etc.) but never actually made an USL appearance are noted at the bottom of the page where appropriate.

A "*" indicates a player known to have appeared for the team prior to 2003.

A
  Trent Abbott
  Adriel Adibi
  Dewayne Allen
  Kyle Altman
  Stephen Ambrose
  Lourenço Andrade de Souza
  Joseph Arnold

B
  Thomas Banks
  Grant Beck
  Dwayne Bergeron
  Craig Black
  Michael Blackburn
  Owen Botting
  Michael Bowden
  Tyler Brady
  Cody Bragg
  Bernard Brodigan
  Eugene Brooks
  Kyle Brown
  Stuart Brown

C
  Dominic Casciato
  Taylor Casillas
  Vassar Cates
  Caesar Cervin*
  Jared Chandler
  Aaron Chibli
  Chris Chilcott
  David Chun
  Sean Clancy
  Matthew Clark
  Eduardo Conde
  Joshua Couvillion
  Leone Cruz

D
  Antonio Da Silva
  Paulo Da Silva
  Diogo De Almeida
  Chad Deering
  Jeff Densk
  Joey Dickenson
  Evan Doan
  Tuan Doan
  Brett Driver

E
  Trevor Eastman

F
  Alexander Fichera
  David Florance
  Tafaria Fray
  Hunter Freeman

G
  John Gall
  Jimmy Garcia
  Fernando Garcia-Garcia
  Gabe Gentile
  Tory Gibson
  Ryszard Gorski
  Jonathan Goulding
  Janrai Gravely
  Bruno Guarda
  Tarik Guendoozi
  Dagoverto Guerrero
  Jose Antonio Guillen

H
  Christopher Hamilton
  Robert Hammett
  Mark Hansen
  Duke Hashimoto
  Justin Hay
  Bryan Haynes
  Lucas Heasley
  Casey Herd
  Louie Hernandez
  Payton Hickey
  Joshua Hill
  Dallas Hollenstein
  Corey Hooper
  Brian Hooten
  Garrett Horvath
  Keegan Hudson

I
  Nnamdi Ihemelu
  Alexandre Ivo
  Arthur Ivo

J
  Robin Johnson-Hood
  J. D. Johnston
  Joshua Jones
  Jake Joy

K
  Thomas Kanu
  Clay King
  Zacry Kinney
  Derek Knutson
  James Koehler

L
  Ryan Latham
  Jared Lee
  Dustin Lemley
  Edward Lett-Preciado
  Anthony Lewis
  Tim Lonergan
  Peter Louis
  Dean Lovegrove
  Robert Luevano
  Alexander Luna
  Bryan Lambert

M
  Collin Mabry
  Casey Madigan
  John Marquart
  David Martin-Romero
  Stephen McCarthy
  James Mertz
  Ryan Mirsky
  Jess Mitchell
  Matt Moore
  John Morrell

N
  Ouyi Nabassi
  Jay Needham

O
  Joard Odera
  Justin Odette
  Richard Oliva

P
  Anthony Pampillonia
  Anastasios Paparounis
  Lance Parker
  Brandon Pfluger
  Ronald Plute
  Mark Pocock
  Jerry Press

R
  Kristopher Rake
  Stuart Renfro
  Alejandro Reveruzzi
  Nick Richter
  Stuart Robinson
  Jesus Rodriguez Huanosto
  Christopher Ross
  Mark Rowland

S
  Dane Saintus
  Dario Saintus
  Bryan Sajjadi
  David Salas
  Shea Salinas
  Chris Salvaggione
  Steve Sandbo
  Mariano Sapien
  Brian Sarber
  Juan Sastoque
  Riccardo Scala
  Dominic Schell
  Alex Smith
  Chad Smith
  Clifford Spence
  David Stockton
  Daniel Summers
  Cole Sweetser

T
  Marvin Tabi
  Sammy Tamporello
  Bryce Taylor
  Mpoki Tenende
  Kevin Terry
  T.J. Tomasso
  Aaron Tucker

U
  Michael Uremovich
  Jon Uriarte

V
  Maros Valko
  Chris Vaughn
  Dillon Vedral
  Mark Vega
  Ernest Villarreal

W
  Joseph Waggoner
  Ashley Walker
  Jamie Watson
  Kenneth Weese
  Kevin White
  Mark White
  Ryan Wileman
  Chase Williams
  Daniel Woolard

Z
  Kellan Zindel

References

DFW Tornados
 
Association football player non-biographical articles